Maria Grazia Cogoli (born 1 October 1962) is a former Italian racewalker, three-time national champion at senior level.

National records
 10,000 m walk (track): 54:52.4 ( Como, 3 October 1982) - until 23 April 1983

Achievements

National titles
Cogoli won three national championships at individual senior level.
Italian Athletics Championships
5000 m race walk (track): 1985, 1986
10,000 m race walk (track): 1985

See also
 Italian team at the running events
 Italy at the IAAF World Race Walking Cup

References

External links
 
 Maria Grazia Cogoli at La marcia nel mondo 

1962 births
Living people
Italian female racewalkers
Italian masters athletes
Sportspeople from Brescia